Petri Mikael Liimatainen (born July 20, 1969, in Hässelby, Sweden) is a former professional ice hockey defenceman. He currently serves as an assistant coach for Malmö Redhawks in the SHL.

Career
Liimatainen began his career with AIK IF in Sweden's Elitserien. After seven seasons he moved to Malmö IF in 1993. In 1995, Liimatainen moved to Germany's Deutsche Eishockey Liga and signed with the Krefeld Pinguine. After a four-year stay, he moved to Switzerland's Nationalliga A with SC Bern but after one season he returned to the DEL and spent the next two seasons playing for the Berlin Capitals and the Kölner Haie

In 2002, he returned to Elitserien and returned to Malmö for a second spell. He stayed for two seasons before moving to Södertälje SK in 2004. He then spent the next three seasons playing in Switzerland for HC Lugano and EHC Basel, Germany for Füchse Duisburg and in Sweden for Linköpings HC as well as a spell in Austria's Erste Bank Eishockey Liga for EHC Black Wings Linz. In 2009, he signed for the Hvidovre Fighters in Denmark's Metal Ligaen.

At the end of the 2009/2010 season, Liimatainen ended his career as a player.

Career statistics

Regular season and playoffs

International

External links
 

1969 births
AIK IF players
Berlin Capitals players
EHC Basel players
EHC Black Wings Linz players
Füchse Duisburg players
HC Lugano players
Hvidovre Ligahockey players
Ice hockey players at the 1992 Winter Olympics
Kölner Haie players
Krefeld Pinguine players
Living people
Linköping HC players
Malmö Redhawks players
Olympic ice hockey players of Sweden
SC Bern players
Södertälje SK players
Ice hockey people from Stockholm
Swedish expatriate sportspeople in Austria
Swedish expatriate ice hockey players in Germany
Swedish expatriate sportspeople in Switzerland
Swedish ice hockey defencemen
Swedish people of Finnish descent